The Roseville Subdivision is a railway line in California and Nevada owned by the Union Pacific Railroad, as part of the Overland Route. It runs from Roseville, California over the Sierra Nevada to Reno, Nevada. The route originated as the initial western segment of the first transcontinental railroad, but has since been upgraded, double tracked, or realigned in some locations.

The route is primarily used for freight, but Amtrak operates passenger trains over the line. The California Zephyr runs the entire route while the Capitol Corridor terminates in Auburn, California with service to the south and west.

Between 2002 and 2005, the right of way was depressed into a trench through Reno to eliminate the 11 level crossings in the downtown area.

See also
 Feather River Route — Union Pacific's other route over the Sierra Nevada

References

Union Pacific Railroad lines
Rail lines in California
Rail infrastructure in Nevada